Paulette Garcia (born ) is a Puerto Rican female volleyball player. 

With her club Lancheras de Cataño she competed at the 2012 FIVB Volleyball Women's Club World Championship.

External links
 profile at FIVB.org

References

1990 births
Living people
Puerto Rican women's volleyball players
Place of birth missing (living people)